Abdolrahman Faramarzi (11 August 1897 – 11 July 1972) was an Iranian journalist, writer, educator, deputy of parliament (the majles) and poet. He was born in Gachuyeh, Faramarzan, Bastak, Hormozgan Province, and died in the capital Tehran. Together with Mostafa Mesbahzadeh, Faramarzi co-founded Kayhan newspaper. Faramarzi was buried in the Behesht-e Zahra cemetery in Tehran.

Faramarzi was also the founder of the short-lived Bahram newspaper.

References

Notes

References
 
 

1897 births
1972 deaths
People from Hormozgan Province
20th-century Iranian writers
Iranian journalists
Iranian educators
20th-century Iranian poets
20th-century Iranian educators
Burials at Behesht-e Zahra
20th-century journalists
People of Pahlavi Iran